Mr. Sub (stylized MR.SUB), originally called Mr. Submarine before the 1990s, is a Canadian chain of over 200 submarine sandwich shops. The first store was opened in 1968 in Toronto's Yorkville neighbourhood, which was then known for its "hippie" culture.

As of 2015, Mr. Sub has seven restaurants across India, one in Dubai, and one in Saudi Arabia with the rest being located in Canada.

History
Mr. Sub was founded in Toronto, Canada, in 1968 by two friends, Jack Levinson, an accounting clerk, and Earl Linzon, a gym teacher, with $1500 start-up capital.

The first Mr. Sub restaurant, then called Mr. Submarine, opened at 130 Yorkville Avenue, on the ground floor of a converted Victorian row house. After a positive response, the two founders opened a second restaurant five months later.

In 1972, Mr. Submarine sold its first franchise, and officially became Mr. Sub in 1990.

After the mid-1990s Mr. Sub went into decline, due to introduction of the Subway franchise in Canada. There was speculation in 2005 that Michael Bregman, the former owner of the Second Cup coffee chain, was contemplating a purchase of the chain. Other names floated as possible suitors have included Swiss Chalet parent Cara Operations and KFC operator Priszm Canadian Income Fund. The doughnut chain Country Style was briefly interested in Mr. Sub in 2005.

On August 18, 2011, MTY Food Group, which by then owned Country Style, announced that it would acquire Mr. Sub at the end of October 2011 for $23 million.

Mr. Sub was originally the only major franchise retailer of submarine sandwiches in Canada, until the arrival of American chains such as Subway. It now faces stiff competition from several quick service restaurant brands, surviving in small town and countryside markets, and regular take-out locations that have always served the sandwich.

Products
Mr. Sub's main product is the submarine sandwich (or "sub"); a long roll, similar to a baguette, filled with meat, cheese, sauces, and vegetables. Other products include, wraps, soups, salads, baked goods, and panini grilled sandwiches. Mr. Sub also purveys some signature products.

Marketing
Mr. Sub uses various marketing channels. Some of the marketing methods that Mr. Sub has adapted into its operations include: strategic partnerships with the country's most visible sports franchises, national promotions, and ongoing in-restaurant campaigns.

Such marketing initiatives allow Mr. Sub to interact with their large and growing consumer base. Mr. Sub occasionally tries to change its campaigns and promotional activities. It made use of the very relaxed marketing approach and slogan known as "Oh Canada, Oh Mr. Sub!". Mr. Sub had launched a TV campaign that reminds consumers of the brand's Canadian identity. "We wanted to highlight the personality of our Canadian company," said Rita McParland, vice-president of marketing at Mr. Sub.

The following slogans, in chronological order, have been used by Mr. Sub: "Lub my Sub"; "Fresh thinking is what we are"; "Taste a Canadian Tradition"; "It's not a sandwich it's a Sub"; "There's always something good going down at Mr. Sub"; and "Oh Canada, Oh Mr. Sub". The business' current slogan is "Yours Since 1968".

In 1982 a Toronto store was used as a filming location for the TV movie “When We First Met” starring child star Amy Linker from CBS’s Square Pegs.

See also
 List of submarine sandwich restaurants

References

External links

 Mr. Sub homepage
  Government of Canada Source Concerning Meat Recall, 2013
  Meat Recall, 2008

Fast-food chains of Canada
Submarine sandwich restaurants
Restaurants established in 1968
Companies based in Toronto
1968 establishments in Ontario